Malakoff (also, Malakoff Diggings) is a former settlement in Nevada County, California. It lay at an elevation of 3051 feet (930 m).

Malakoff was a mining town, named for Malakoff tower, near Sebastopol, a name in the news during the Crimean War.

References

See also
 Malakoff Diggins State Historic Park

Former populated places in California
Former settlements in Nevada County, California